Valleem Thetti Pulleem Thetti is a 2016 Indian Malayalam-language romantic comedy film written and directed by Rishi Sivakumar. It stars Kunchacko Boban, Renji Panicker, Manoj K.Jayan, Saiju Kurup and Shamili (in her first and only Malayalam film as a leading actress). The film hinges on cinema culture and the presentation of 1990s film themes & styles. The film was released on 12 May 2016 to an opening of 4.9 cr which is the highest till date for a solo Kunchacko Boban movie but was panned and flopped at the box office.

Plot

The story is set in the 1990s in a village and its about film culture. Vinayan is a young man, who works as a projector operator in Sreedevi Talkies, an old "C" class cinema theatre. The owner of the theatre is Madhavan Nair, who is like a godfather to Vinayan. Madhavan inherited it from his father who was a film nut. Madhavan finds it hard to run the business and loses his right to land to the village's wealthy businessman Menon due to debt and leaves the village. Vinayan is in love with the Menon's daughter, Sreedevi. Neer is the town's infamous moonshiner who supports Vinayan's love and dies later in an accident resulting from intoxication. Vinayan and his friends often find in trouble with Biju and his friends over petty issues. During the village's annual temple festival Vinayan plans to run away with Sreedevi. Menon finds this out and attempts to kill Vinayan. A misfired firework during the festival lands on Menon and he dies off-screen. Everyone in the village is happy and they continue the talkies that were on the verge of shutdown.

Cast

References

External links

2016 films
2010s Malayalam-language films
Films scored by Sooraj S. Kurup